The Tal Institute/ Machon Tal (Makhon Tal), founded in 1999, is the main women's division of the Jerusalem College of Technology. It is located in the Givat Shaul neighborhood of Jerusalem. Over 320 students from Israel and around the world study there.
The uniqueness of the Machon Tal is that it combines engineering and/or management studies with the study of Torah. It is also the only religious school in Israel to offer an academic degree in Nursing. The academic studies are offered at a university level, with full recognition from the Council for Higher Education in Israel. The students come from a broad range of religious backgrounds in Israel and the Diaspora. Due to the large number of olim, the Tal Institute also has a New Olim Department. The department assists the new immigrants in various ways from tutoring in difficult subjects to extra time on tests.

Degrees 
The Tal Institute awards the following degrees:
 Bachelor of Science in: Applied Physics/Electro-Optical Engineering, Applied Physics - Medical Engineering, Software Engineering, Computer Sciences, Computational Chemistry, and Industrial Engineering. 
 Bachelor of Managerial Accounting and Information Systems
 Bachelor of Technical Management & Marketing
 Bachelor of Nursing

Goals 
 To teach the students to incorporate into their secular lives also Torah study and Derech Eretz.
 To train religious engineers and managers that will integrate into the elite technological industry and management staffs of Israel. 
 To allow those who are interested in working in education to receive a teaching degree in addition.

Midreshet Ma'amakim 
Midreshet Ma'amakim is the Jewish studies program located on the campus; see Midrasha. All students integrate Jewish studies classes from Midreshet Ma'amakim with their regular academic studies.

See also 
 Herzog College
 Lifshitz College of Education
 Machon Gold
 Michlala
 Migdal Oz (seminary)
 Talpiot College of Education

References

External links 
 campus-tal, jct.ac.il

Colleges in Israel
Jerusalem College of Technology
Educational institutions established in 1999
1999 establishments in Israel